The  is an electric multiple unit (EMU) commuter train type operated by the private railway operator Keihan Electric Railway in Kyoto, Japan, since 1997.

Design
The 9000 series trains were developed from the earlier 7200 series trains introduced in 1995.

Formations
, the fleet consists of four eight-car sets and one seven-car set. The fleet originally consisted of five eight-car sets, but one set, 9001, was reduced to seven cars in 2015.

8-car sets
The eight-car sets are formed as follows, with four motored ("M") cars and four non-powered trailer ("T") cars.

 "Mc" cars are motored driving cars (with driving cabs).
 "M" cars are motored intermediate cars with driving facilities at one end for depot shunting.
 "T" cars are unpowered trailer cars.
 The Mc and M cars each have one scissors-type pantograph.
 The 9500 cars are designated as "mildly air-conditioned" cars.

7-car sets
The reformed seven-car set, 9001, is formed as follows, with three motored ("M") cars and four non-powered trailer ("T") cars.

 "Mc" cars are motored driving cars (with driving cabs).
 "M" cars are motored intermediate cars with driving facilities at one end for depot shunting.
 "T" cars are unpowered trailer cars.
 The "T6" car has driving facilities at one end for depot shunting.
 The Mc and M cars each have one scissors-type pantograph.
 The 9500 car is designated as "mildly air-conditioned" cars.

Interior
Passenger accommodation originally consisted of a mixture of fixed transverse seating and longitudinal bench seating, but seating was converted to longitudinal seating only from 2008.

History

The first trains entered revenue service in 1997.

In March 2015, set 9001 was reformed as a seven-car set. Cars 9601 and 9602, removed from sets 9001 and 9002 when they were reduced to seven cars, were subsequently renumbered 10701 and 10751 respectively and inserted into 10000 series EMU set 10001 in February 2016 when that set was lengthened from four to seven cars.

References

External links

  

Electric multiple units of Japan
9000 series
Train-related introductions in 1997
Kawasaki multiple units
1500 V DC multiple units of Japan